El Oued (meaning the River), Souf or Oued Souf is a city, and the capital of El Oued Province, in Algeria. The oasis town is watered by an underground river, hence its name is El Oued which enables date palm cultivation and the rare use (for the desert) of brick construction for housing. As most roofs are domed, it is known as the "City of a Thousand Domes".

The population of El Oued was 134,699 as of the 2008 census, up from 105,256 in 1998, with a population growth rate of 2.5%.

History 

In 11th, Fatimids send Banu Hilal in Tripolitania, Tunisia and Constantine area against Zirids.

Culture 

The inhabitants are thought to be Teroud tribe (Arabic: بنو طرود) living in and near Oued Souf area, however it is more likely that modern day Soufis are descendants of the original inhabitants of the oasis.

Climate

El Oued has a hot desert climate (Köppen climate classification BWh), with very hot summers and mild winters. Rainfall is light and sporadic, and summers are particularly dry.

Transportation
The N16 highway connects El Oued to Touggourt to the southwest and Tebessa to the northeast. The N48 connects El Oued to the town of Still to the north, from which the N3 may be used to reach Biskra.

Education

7.4% of the population has a tertiary education, and another 17.5% has completed secondary education. The overall literacy rate is 86.1% (second highest in the province), and is 91.2% among males (second highest in the province) and 80.6% among females (equal highest in the province).

Localities
The commune of El Oued is composed of six localities:

El Oued
Mahda
Legtouta
Keraïma
Oum Sahaouine
Mih Bahi Sud

References

External links

 El-Oued: Pearl of Sahara

Communes of El Oued Province
Oases of Algeria
Cities in Algeria
Province seats of Algeria
El Oued Province